Zalužice is a village and municipality in Michalovce District in the Kosice Region of eastern Slovakia.

History
In historical records the village was first mentioned in 1249.

Geography
The village lies at an altitude of 127 metres and covers an area of 19.611 km². The municipality has a population of about 1140 people.

Gallery

See also
 List of municipalities and towns in Michalovce District
 List of municipalities and towns in Slovakia

External links

https://web.archive.org/web/20071027094149/http://www.statistics.sk/mosmis/eng/run.html

Villages and municipalities in Michalovce District
Villages in Slovakia merged with other villages